Polli may refer to:

Places 
 Põlli, a village in Märjamaa Parish, Rapla County, in western Estonia
 Polli, Estonia, a village in Mulgi Parish

People 
 Andrea Polli (born 1968), environmental artist
 Carlo Polli (born 1989), Swiss footballer
 Emilio Polli (1901–1983), Italian swimmer
 Gert-René Polli (born 1960), head of the Austrian Bundesamt für Verfassungsschutz und Terrorismusbekämpfung
 Laura Polli (born 1983), Swiss racewalker
 Lou Polli (1901–2000), American baseball pitcher
 Luan Polli Gomes (born 1993), Brazilian footballer 
 Marie Polli (born 1980), Swiss racewalker

Species 
 Abacetus polli, a beetle of family Carabidae
 Hyperolius polli, a frog of family Hyperoliidae
 Ichthyococcus polli, a fish of family Phosichthyidae
 Labeo polli, a fish of family Cyprinidae
 Microsynodontis polli, a fish of family Mochokidae
 Notonomus polli, a beetle of family Carabidae
 Oxylapia polli, a fish of family Cichlidae
 Placidochromis polli, a fish of family Cichlidae
 Polyipnus polli, a fish of family Sternoptychidae
 Synodontis polli, a fish of family Mochokidae
 Tropheus polli, a fish of family Cichlidae

Other uses 
 Polli (company), an Italian food company
 Polli Sree College, Bangladesh

See also 
 Polli:Nation, a UK social movement